The 1888 United States presidential election in Delaware took place on November 6, 1888, as part of the 1888 United States presidential election. Voters chose three representatives, or electors to the Electoral College, who voted for president and vice president.

Delaware voted for the Democratic nominee, incumbent President Grover Cleveland, over the Republican nominee, Benjamin Harrison. Cleveland won the state by a margin of 11.64%.

This was the last time until 2000 that a Republican was elected president without winning Delaware.

Results

See also
 United States presidential elections in Delaware

Notes

References

Delware
1888
1888 Delaware elections